Mónica Azón (born 19 October 1972) is a Spanish sailor. She competed at the 2004 Summer Olympics and the 2008 Summer Olympics.

References

External links
 

1972 births
Living people
Spanish female sailors (sport)
Olympic sailors of Spain
Sailors at the 2004 Summer Olympics – Yngling
Sailors at the 2008 Summer Olympics – Yngling
Sportspeople from Barcelona